Semonkong is a community council located in the Maseru District of Lesotho. Semonkong, meaning "Place of Smoke", was established in the 1880s as a refuge for Basotho displaced by the Gun War. It is located close to several major natural features, including the Maletsunyane Falls and the 3096-metre peak of Thaba Putsoa. The population in 2006 was 7,781.

History
Semonkong was founded in the early 1880s by Sotho refugees who were displaced by the forces of the Cape Colony during the Basuto Gun War.

Villages
The community of Semonkong includes the villages of Boitumelo, Ha Farelane, Ha Khonyeli, Ha Lentiti, Ha Lepae, Ha Lesala, Ha Lesia, Ha Leteketa, Ha Mateketa, Ha Moahloli, Ha Moahloli (Qoang), Ha Moahloli (Thusong), Ha Moqibi, Ha Motšoane, Ha Phallang, Ha Ramabanta, Ha Rasefale, Ha Seqhoasho, Ha Sethuoa-Majoe, Ha Sikeme, Ha Tlalinyana (Likoeneng), Ha Tšitso, Letlapeng, Letšeng, Mabote, Mantorina, Meeling, Moriting, Mosoang, Motse-Mocha, Pontšeng, Sekhutlong, Thaba-Chitja, Tsekana, Tšenekeng and Tšoeu-tšoana.

See also
Semonkong Airport

References

External links
 Google map of community villages
 

Populated places in Maseru District